In mathematical analysis, Fourier integral operators have become an important tool in the theory of partial differential equations.  The class of Fourier integral operators contains differential operators as well as classical integral operators as special cases.

A Fourier integral operator  is given by:

It is also necessary to require that  on the support of a.

Examples
One motivation for the study of Fourier integral operators is the solution operator for the initial value problem for the wave operator. Indeed, consider the following problem:

and

The solution to this problem is given by

These need to be interpreted as oscillatory integrals since they do not in general converge. This formally looks like a sum of two Fourier integral operators, however the coefficients in each of the integrals are not smooth at the origin, and so not standard symbols. If we cut out this singularity with a cutoff function, then the so obtained operators still provide solutions to the initial value problem modulo smooth functions. Thus, if we are only interested in the propagation of singularities of the initial data, it is sufficient to consider such operators. In fact, if we allow the sound speed c in the wave equation to vary with position we can still find a Fourier integral operator that provides a solution modulo smooth functions, and Fourier integral operators thus provide a useful tool for studying the propagation of singularities of solutions to variable speed wave equations, and more generally for other hyperbolic equations.

See also

 Microlocal analysis
 Fourier transform
 Pseudodifferential operator
 Oscillatory integral operator
 Symplectic category

Notes

References
 Elias Stein, Harmonic Analysis: Real-variable Methods, Orthogonality and Oscillatory Integrals. Princeton University Press, 1993. 
 F. Treves, Introduction to Pseudo Differential and Fourier Integral Operators, (University Series in Mathematics), Plenum Publ. Co. 1981. 
 J.J. Duistermaat, Fourier Integral Operators, (Progress in Mathematics), Birkhäuser 1995.

External links
 

Partial differential equations
Microlocal analysis
Fourier analysis
Harmonic analysis